Last One Standing (Chinese: 與敵同行; literally "walking with the enemy") is a 2008 Hong Kong television drama serial created by Amy Wong and produced by TVB. Premiering on Hong Kong's Jade and HD Jade channels on 22 September 2008, the serial ran for 22 episodes.

The serial tells the story of ex-convict Hei (Kevin Cheng), a young man who was sentenced to ten years in prison after he was framed for murdering his stepfather. When Hei is released, he exacts vengeance on his cousin and best friend Yin (Roger Kwok), who was a key witness of the murder.

Synopsis
Time was served for a crime he did not commit. 
After ten years, can he discover the truth behind his stepfather's murder?

Former Hong Kong Correctional Services personnel Cheung Sing-hei (Kevin Cheng) was sent to prison for murdering his stepfather. The key witness of the case turns out to be his cousin and best friend Tong Lap-yin (Roger Kwok). Ten years later, Hei is released from prison. Yin is now one of the most influential people in the city while Hei's reputation and future are in ruins. Feeling extremely frustrated and harbouring suspicions about the case ten years ago, he is desperate to find out the truth behind his stepfather's death. After some investigation, Hei realises who the real killer was, but there appears to be no motive. More importantly, evidence is also lacking. This story is about how Hei exposes the truth and ultimately proves his innocence.

Cast

Viewership ratings

Awards and nominations
41st TVB Anniversary Awards (2008)
 "Best Drama"
 "Best Actor in a Leading Role" (Kevin Cheng - Cheung Sing-Hei)
 "My Favourite Male Character Role" (Kevin Cheng - Cheung Sing-Hei)

International Broadcast
  - 8TV (Malaysia)

References

External links
TVB.com Last One Standing - Official Website 
TVB.com Last One Standing - Official Blog 
Astro On Demand.com Last One Standing - Astro Official Website  
TVB Review Blog Last One Standing - Episode Summaries and Screen Captures 

TVB dramas
2008 Hong Kong television series debuts
2008 Hong Kong television series endings